Huperzia is a genus of lycophyte plants, sometimes known as the firmosses or fir clubmosses; the Flora of North America calls them gemma fir-mosses. This genus was originally included in the related genus Lycopodium, from which it differs in having undifferentiated sporangial leaves, and the sporangia not formed into apical cones.  The common name firmoss, used for some of the north temperate species, refers to their superficial resemblance to branches of fir (Abies), a conifer. , two very different circumscriptions of the genus were in use. In the Pteridophyte Phylogeny Group classification of 2016 (PPG I), Huperzia is one of three genera in the subfamily Huperzioideae of the family Lycopodiaceae. Most species in the subfamily are placed in the genus Phlegmariurus. Huperzia is left with about 25 species, although not all have been formally transferred to other genera. Other sources recognize only Huperzia, which then has about 340 species.

Morphology
The sporophytes of this genus have unbranched shoots that are generally upright and round in cross section. Horizontal stems are absent. The leaves are not borne in distinct ranks, and are usually somewhat lanceolate in shape. In some species, they vary in size according to the season in which they grow. Branchlets bearing gemmae – bud-like structures by which the plant reproduces asexually – occur among the leaves. The gemmae are triangular, with eight leaves in a constant pattern: four flattened into a plane and two large lateral leaves. The sporangia are kidney-shaped (reniform), occurring at the base of a leaf that is either unmodified or reduced. The roots are produced near the apex of shoots, and migrate downwards inside the cortex of the stem to emerge at soil level. The unbranched gametophytes are not photosynthetic, but rather subterranean and mycorrhizal.

The Flora of North America distinguishes Huperzia from the epiphytic tropical genus Phlegmariurus on the basis of differences such as the former's complex and specialized shoots, the gemmae and the branchlets on which they are borne, and the unbranched gametophytes.

Taxonomy
The genus Huperzia was created by Johann Jakob Bernhardi in 1801. Bernhardi separated Huperzia from Lycopodium. The type species is Lycopodium selago which became Huperzia selago.

In the Pteridophyte Phylogeny Group classification of 2016 (PPG I), Huperzia is placed in the subfamily Huperzioideae of the family Lycopodiaceae. A phylogenetic study in 2016, employing both molecular and morphological data, concluded that either a one-genus or a three-genus division of the subfamily produced monophyletic taxa. The authors preferred the three-genus division, recognizing Huperzia, Phlegmariurus and Phylloglossum. Their preferred hypothesis for the relationships of the three genera was:

The majority of the species formerly placed in a broadly defined Huperzia belong in Phlegmariurus. Earlier, the Flora of North America had also separated Huperzia from Phegmariurus. However, Phlegmariurus is difficult to separate morphologically, and others have preferred the one-genus division of the subfamily.

Species
The PPG I classification stated there were 25 species in the genus Huperzia. , World Ferns listed 61 species, noting that "many species still need transfer into other split genera".

Huperzia acicularis Björk, provisionally accepted
Huperzia appalachiana Beitel & Mickel
Huperzia archboldiana (Nessel) Holub
Huperzia arunachalensis (D.D.Pant & P.S.Pandey) Fraser-Jenk.
Huperzia asiatica (Ching) N.Shrestha & X.C.Zhang
Huperzia australiana (Herter) Holub
Huperzia beccarii (Alderw.) Holub
Huperzia beiteliana Mickel
Huperzia bucahwangensis Ching
Huperzia campestris (Alderw.) Holub
Huperzia catharinae (Christ) Holub
Huperzia ceylanica (Spring) Rothm.
Huperzia chinensis (Christ) Ching
Huperzia chishuiensis X.Y.Wang & P.S.Wang
Huperzia continentalis Testo, A.Haines & A.V.Gilman
Huperzia crispata (Ching) Ching
Huperzia delavayi (Christ & Herter) Ching
Huperzia emeiensis (Ching & H.S.Kung) Ching & H.S.Kung
Huperzia erosa Beitel & W.H.Wagner
Huperzia erubescens (Brack.) Holub
Huperzia europaea Björk, provisionally accepted
Huperzia everettii (Herter) Holub
Huperzia fuegiana (Roiv.) Holub
Huperzia gedeana (Alderw.) Holub
Huperzia goliathensis (Alderw.) Holub
Huperzia haleakalae (Brack.) Holub
Huperzia herteriana (Kümmerle) T.Sen & U.Sen
Huperzia javanica (Sw.) Fraser-Jenk.
Huperzia jejuensis B.Y.Sun & J.Lim
Huperzia kangdingensis (Ching) Ching
Huperzia kunmingensis Ching
Huperzia laipoensis Ching
Huperzia lajouensis Ching
Huperzia leishanensis X.Y.Wang
Huperzia liangshanica (H.S.Kung) Ching & H.S.Kung
Huperzia lucidula (Michx.) Trevis.
Huperzia medogensis Ching & Y.X.Lin
Huperzia meghalaica Fraser-Jenk.
Huperzia miniata (Spring) Trevis.
Huperzia minima (Herter) Holub
Huperzia miyoshiana (Makino) Ching
Huperzia muscicola W.M.Chu
Huperzia nanchuanensis (Ching & H.S.Kung) Ching & H.S.Kung
Huperzia nanlingensis Shrestha, F.W.Xing, X.P.Qi, Y.H.Yan & X.C.Zhang
Huperzia occidentalis (Clute) Kartesz & Gandhi
Huperzia porophila (F.E.Lloyd & Underw.) Holub
Huperzia quasipolytrichoides (Hayata) Ching
Huperzia rubicaulis S.K.Wu & X.Cheng
Huperzia saururoides (Bory & D'Urv.) Rothm.
Huperzia selago (L.) Bernh. (including H. selago subsp. appressa - Appalachian firmoss)
Huperzia serrata (Thunb.) Trevis.
Huperzia shresthae Fraser-Jenk.
Huperzia somae (Hayata) Ching
Huperzia sprengeri (Nessel) Holub
Huperzia suberecta (Lowe) Tardieu
Huperzia subintegra (Hillebr.) Beitel & W.H.Wagner
Huperzia sumatrana (Alderw.) Holub
Huperzia sutchueniana (Herter) Ching
Huperzia tibetica (Ching) Ching
Huperzia yakusimensis (Herter) Holub
Huperzia zollingeri (Herter) Holub

The following hybrids have been described:
Huperzia × bartleyi (Cusick) Holub
Huperzia × buttersii (Abbe) Kartesz & Gandhi
Huperzia × carlquistii Beitel & W.H.Wagner
Huperzia × gillettii Beitel & W.H.Wagner
Huperzia × josephbeitelii A.Haines
Huperzia × medeirosii Beitel & W.H.Wagner
Huperzia × protoporophila A.Haines
Huperzia × sulcinervia (Spring) Trevis.

Distribution and habitat
As circumscribed in the PPG I classification, Huperzia is distributed in temperate, arctic and alpine habitats, including mountains in tropical Asia. Its species are terrestrial or grow on rocks. Phlegmariurus is epiphytic, and has a worldwide tropical distribution, so when Huperzia is defined broadly to include all three genera of the subfamily Huperzioideae, it has an almost worldwide distribution, absent mainly in North Africa, the Arabian Peninsula and Western Asia.

References

External links 
Picture gallery

 
Lycophyte genera